Branch insignia of the Islamic Revolutionary Guard Corps (IRGC) refers to military emblems that may be worn on the uniform of the Iranian Guard Corps to denote membership in a particular area of expertise and series of functional areas.

General branches

Naval force branches

Aerospace force branches

See also 
 Iranian Army Branch Insignia
 Iranian Police Branch Insignia
 Badges of honor in Iran

Military Branch Insignia of IRGC
Islamic Revolutionary Guard Corps